Ust-Tarksky District is an administrative and municipal district (raion), one of the thirty in Novosibirsk Oblast, Russia. It is located in the west of the oblast. Its administrative center is the rural locality (a selo) of Ust-Tarka. Population: 12,307 (2010 Census);  The population of Ust-Tarka accounts for 31.0% of the district's total population.

Notable residents 

Viktor Markin (born 1957 in the village of Oktyabrsky), Soviet Olympic athlete

References

Notes

Sources

Districts of Novosibirsk Oblast